Scapegoat: The Jews, Israel, and Women's Liberation is the ninth nonfiction book by Jewish-American radical feminist writer and activist Andrea Dworkin. It was first published in 2000 by Free Press. In Scapegoat, Dworkin compared the oppression of women to the persecution of Jews, discussed the sexual politics of Jewish identity and antisemitism, and called for the establishment of a women's homeland as a response to the oppression of women, just as the Zionist movement had established a state for Jews.

Reception

Scapegoat received a negative review from Kirkus Reviews, stating that Dworkin "exhibits an ignorance of many of the subjects most relevant to her argument" and that she "ends up committing the very sin she seeks to expose, 'scapegoating' all men for all injustice in every period of history."

References

Further reading
 
 
 

2000 non-fiction books
American non-fiction books
Books about antisemitism
Books about Israel
Books about nationalism
Books about Palestinians
Books about Zionism
Books by Andrea Dworkin
English-language books
Free Press (publisher) books
Jewish feminism
Radical feminist books